Young County may refer to:
 Young County, Texas
 Young County, New South Wales
 County of Young, South Australia